The 2014 Houston Baptist Huskies football team represented Houston Baptist University—now known as Houston Christian University—as a member of the Southland Conference during the 2014 NCAA Division I FCS football season. Led by second-year head coach Vic Shealy the Huskies compiled an overall record of 2–9 with a mark of 1–7 in conference play, placing tenth in the Southland. 2014 was Houston Baptist's first official season of college football—the seven-game 2013 season was technically an exhibition season—and the first as a member of the Southland Conference for football.

The season also marked the start of play in a new on-campus stadium, Husky Stadium on the Dunham Field. The first game in the new stadium was played on September 6 against .

Schedule

Game summaries

McMurry
Sources:

@ Northern Colorado
Sources:

@ Texas College
Sources:

Abilene Christian
Sources:

@ Incarnate Word
Sources:

@ Central Arkansas
Sources:

Stephen F. Austin
Sources:

Nicholls
Sources:

@ Lamar
Sources:

@ Southeastern Louisiana
Sources:

Sam Houston State
Sources:

References

Houston Baptist
Houston Christian Huskies football seasons
Houston Baptist Huskies football